Franz Joseph Glæser  (19 April 1798 - 29 August 1861), also spelt as Glaeser and Gläser, was an Austrian-Danish composer.

Born in Obergeorgenthal, Bohemia, then part of the Austrian Empire, Glaeser’s work as a composer was mostly done before he migrated to Denmark, to spend much of his later life in Copenhagen. He gained his first position as a Kapellmeister at the Leopoldstadt Theater in 1817 and his last at Copenhagen in 1842, retaining the position until his death in 1861.

Work
 Die vier Haimonskinder (1809)
 Bärnburgs Sturz (1817)
 Das Mädchen ohne Zunge (1819)
 Das Felsenmädchen (1820)
 Der geraubte Schleier (1820)
 Der Tambour (1820)
 Sküs, Mond und Pagat (1820)
 Wenn's was ist, so ist's nichts und ist's nichts, so sind's 36 Kreuzer (1820)
 Arsenius der Weiberfeind (1823)
 Dank und Undank (1823)
 Der rasende Roland (1823)
 Stumme Liebe (1823)
 Der Brief an sich selbst (1824)
 Der Erlenkönig (1824)
 Die kurzen Mäntel (1824)
 Die Rettung durch die Sparkassa (1824)
 Liebe und Haß (1824)
 Sauertöpfchen (1824)
 Sieben Mädchen in Uniform (1825)
 Der Bär und das Kind (1825)
 Die sonderbare Laune (1825)
 Die Weiber in Uniform (1825)
 Die Zauberin Armida (1825)
 Heliodor, Beherrscher der Elemente (1825)
 Menagerie und optische Zimmerreise in Krähwinkel (1825)
 Die steinerne Jungfrau (1826)
 Oberon, König der Elfen (1827)
 Peterl und Paulerl (1827)
 Abu, der schwarze Wundermann (1828)
 Armida, die Zauberin im Orient (1825)
 Elsbeth (1828)
 Meister Pilgram, Erbauer des Stephansturmes in Wien (1828)
 Peter Stiglitz
 Staberl
 Die steinerne Jungfrau
 Der Rattenfänger von Hameln
 Aurora (c.1830 Berlin)
 Die Brautschau auf Kronstein (1830, Berlín)
 Andrea (1830 Berlín)
 Des Adlers Horst (29.12.1832, Berlín)
 Die Augen des Teufels
 Bryllupet vet Como-søen (29.1.1849, Kodaň)
 Nøkken (12.2.1853, Kodaň)
 Den forgyldte svane (17.3.1854, Kodaň)

See also
List of Danish composers

References

This article was initially translated from the Danish Wikipedia.

1798 births
1861 deaths
People from Horní Jiřetín
People from the Kingdom of Bohemia
German Bohemian people
Austrian composers
Danish composers
Male composers
Austrian emigrants to Denmark
19th-century male musicians